Indoxyl sulfate, also known as 3-indoxylsulfate and 3-indoxylsulfuric acid, is a metabolite of dietary  that acts as a cardiotoxin and uremic toxin. High concentrations of indoxyl sulfate in blood plasma are known to be associated with the development and progression of chronic kidney disease and vascular disease in humans. As a uremic toxin, it stimulates glomerular sclerosis and renal interstitial fibrosis.

Biosynthesis
Indoxyl sulfate is a metabolite of dietary  that is synthesized through the following metabolic pathway:
 → indole → indoxyl → indoxyl sulfate

Indoxyl is produced from indole via enzyme-mediated hydroxylation in the liver; in vitro experiments with rat and human liver microsomes suggest that the CYP450 enzyme CYP2E1 hydroxylates indole into indoxyl. Subsequently, indoxyl is converted into indoxyl sulfate by sulfotransferase enzymes in the liver; based upon in vitro experiments with recombinant human sulfotransferases, SULT1A1 appears to be the primary sulfotransferase enzyme involved in the conversion of indoxyl into indoxyl sulfate.

Clinical significance 
Occasionally in urinary tract infections, bacteria produce indoxyl phosphatase which splits indoxyl sulfate forming indigo and indirubin creating dramatic purple urine. Indoxyl sulfate is also a product of indole metabolism, which is produced from tryptophan by intestinal flora, such as Escherichia coli.

References

Amino acid derivatives
Indoles
Sulfate esters
Toxins